Registered Nurse is a 1934 American Pre-Code film produced by First National Pictures and released through its parent company Warner Bros. The film was directed by Robert Florey and stars Bebe Daniels in her final role for Warner Bros.

Plot
Sylvia Benson (Bebe Daniels) is married to belligerent drunk (Gordon Westcott) but after a violent quarrel which results in a car crash, she decides to go back to nursing. Three years later Benson is the best nurse at the hospital, all the doctors think so including dedicated surgeon Dr. Hedwig (John Halliday) and chronic skirt chaser Dr. Connolly (Lyle Talbot).

Sylvia has a secret, after the car crash her husband went insane and is now in an asylum. That's why she is keeping the doctors at arm's length whenever they mention marriage. Suddenly he escapes and finds himself at the same hospital where Sylvia is stationed (he doesn't know that) wanting an operation to return his sanity so he can make up to his wife for all those bitter years. A chance conversation with an interfering patient (Sidney Toler) give Jim Benton the idea to leap out of the hospital window to his death, paving the way for Sylvia to find happiness with Dr. Hedwig.

Cast
 Bebe Daniels as Sylvia Benton
 Lyle Talbot as Dr. Greg Connolly
 John Halliday as Dr. Hedwig
 Irene Franklin as Sadie Harris
 Sidney Toler as Frankie Sylvestrie
 Gordon Westcott as Jim Benton
 Minna Gombell as Nurse Beulah Schloss
 Beulah Bondi as Nurse McKenna
 Vince Barnett as Jerry
 Phillip Reed as Bill
 Mayo Methot as Nurse Gloria Hammond
 Edward Gargan as Officer O'Brien

Preservation status
Registered Nurse is preserved at the Library of Congress.

Home video
The film is currently offered on Warner Archive Collection home label, double-billed with the Ruth Chatterton film The Crash.

References

External links
 
 
 
 

1934 films
American films based on plays
Warner Bros. films
1934 romantic drama films
American romantic drama films
American black-and-white films
1930s American films
1930s English-language films